Sir Colin Crichton Mackay (born 26 September 1943) is a former British judge and barrister. He was a Justice of the High Court of England and Wales from 2001 until his retirement in 2013.

Education
Mackay attended the boys-only boarding school Radley College, then Corpus Christi College, Oxford.

Legal career
Mackay was called to the bar (Middle Temple) in 1967 and was made a bencher in 1995. Mackay became a Queen's Counsel in 1998, and was appointed a Recorder in 1992. On 24 January 2001, he was appointed a High Court judge, receiving the customary knighthood, and assigned to the Queen's Bench Division. Upon reaching the age of 70, Mackay retired from the judiciary.

In retirement, he was appointed a Surveillance Commissioner. He will serve in that role for a three-year term, between 1 September 2015 and 31 August 2018.

References

1943 births
Living people
21st-century English judges
Queen's Bench Division judges
People educated at Radley College
Alumni of Corpus Christi College, Oxford
Members of the Middle Temple
English barristers
20th-century King's Counsel
Knights Bachelor